Andrew Hansson (13 October 1882 – 8 July 1964) was a Swedish cyclist. He competed at the 1906 and the 1908 Summer Olympics.

References

External links
 

1882 births
1964 deaths
Swedish male cyclists
Olympic cyclists of Sweden
Cyclists at the 1906 Intercalated Games
Cyclists at the 1908 Summer Olympics
Sportspeople from Gothenburg